The 1994–95 Irish Cup was the 115th edition of Northern Ireland's premier football knock-out cup competition. It concluded on 6 May 1995 with the final.

Linfield were the defending champions after winning their 34th Irish Cup last season, with a 2–0 win over Bangor in the 1994 final. They retained the trophy with a 3–1 win over Carrick Rangers in the final this season, to win it for the 35th time.

This was the last final to be played at The Oval for 20 years, until 2015, when the redevelopment of Windsor Park meant that the final had to be played elsewhere.

Results

First round
The following teams were given byes into the second round: 1st Bangor Old Boys, Barn United, Dromara Village, Dromore Amateurs, Larne Tech Old Boys, Malachians, Northern Telecom, Portstewart, Queen's University, Roe Valley and Saintfield United.

|}

Replays

|}

Second round

|}

Replays

|}

Third round

|}

Fourth round

|}

Replays

|}

Fifth round

|}

Replays

|}

Sixth round

|}

Replays

|}

Quarter-finals

|}

Replays

|}

Semi-finals

|}

Replay

|}

Final

References

1994–95
1994–95 domestic association football cups
Irish Cup